Jean-François Pichette (born 1962 in Montreal, Quebec) is a Québécois actor.

Filmography
 Straight for the Heart (À corps perdu) (1988), as Quentin
 An Imaginary Tale (Une histoire inventée) (1990), as Tibo
 Montréal P.Q. (1992) (TV series), as Mike Belzile
 Being at Home with Claude (1992), as Claude
 C'était le 12 du 12 et Chili avait les blues (1994), as Père de Chili
 Desire in Motion (Mouvements du désir) (1994), as Vincent
 Virginie (1996) (TV series), as Daniel Charron (1996-1999)
 Le Chapeau ou L'histoire d'un malentendu (2000)
 Chartrand et Simonne (2000) (TV series), as Jean Marchand
 Fortier (2001) (TV series), as Claude Mayrand
 Les Poupées russes (2002) (TV series), as Jean-Louis Gagnon
 Secret de banlieue (2002), as David
 Un homme mort (2006) (TV series), as Emmanuel Dunston
 Nos Étés (2006) (TV series), as John Desrochers
 Trauma (2010–present) (TV series), as Dr. Mathieu Darveau
 Nouvelle adresse (2014–present)
 Thanks for Everything (Merci pour tout) - 2019
 Portrait-Robot (2021), as Patrick Lacenaire

See also
List of Quebec actors

External links
 

1962 births
Living people
Canadian male television actors
Canadian male film actors
Male actors from Montreal